Thorold Francis Coade (1896-1963) was a British school teacher and headmaster.

Thorold Coade was headmaster at Bryanston School in Dorset for much of his career (1932–1959), succeeding J. G. Jeffreys. He believed in self-discipline and developed this ethos at the school. He developed "pioneering" at the school to augment sports, consisting of community-related activities, such as forestry in the extensive grounds of the school. Coade was keen on drama and the school's theatre is named the Coade Hall in his memory.

Books

References

1896 births
1963 deaths
Headmasters of Bryanston School
English non-fiction writers
Loyal Regiment officers
English male non-fiction writers
20th-century English male writers